Ulrich Kienzle (9 May 1936 – 16 April 2020) was a German journalist and author. He was known for specializing in the politics and culture of the Middle East. He worked for several broadcasters, including German public television networks ARD and ZDF. He was one of the few Western journalists to interview Muammar Gaddafi in the 1970s. In 1990, he was the last western journalist who interviewedSaddam Hussein, days before Gulf War started. Kienzle was known for appearing on Frontal, a ZDF series of political discussions also featuring broadcast journalist Bodo Hugo Hauser.
He was one of the most famouse journalists in the six German speaking countries.

Life 
Kienzle was born in Neckargröningen, Württemberg, today part of Baden-Württemberg in southwest Germany. He was 9 years old when World War II ended and 13 when the Federal Republic of Germany was founded.

In 1974, Kienzle started working for the national public broadcaster ARD as a correspondent, from 1974 to 1977 covering the Middle East and stationed in Beirut. He was among the first journalists to interview Muammar Gaddafi, then a young rebel. From 1977 to 1980, he was ARD's correspondent for Southern Africa. From 1980 to 1990, he was chief editor of North German regional broadcaster Radio Bremen (RB).

From 1990 to 1993, Kienzle was chief editor for foreign affairs at Hessischer Rundfunk (Hessian Broadcasting) and anchor for Zweites Deutsches Fernsehen (ZDF), presenting the foreign affairs magazine . In this position, in 1990 he was one of the few Western journalists allowed to interview Iraqi dictator Saddam Hussein. From 1993 to 2000, he was one of the "combatants" in the weekly ZDF political magazine , which always featured a controversial debate between the more leftist Kienzle, usually taking the position of the Social Democratic Party of Germany (SPD), and the more rightist Bodo Hugo Hauser, usually taking the position of the Christian Democratic Union of Germany (CDU).

In the 2000s, Kienzle hosted a ZDF program on German political campaigns in the run-up to the 2002 federal election, and beginning in 2003 contributed to a ZDF broadcast 'magazine' on the economy.
 He was interviewed on events in the Middle East, such as the Iraq War, the War in Afghanistan and the Arab Spring revolts.

Kienzle died in Wiesbaden, Hesse, on 16 April 2020, aged 83.

Honours 
 1977: Order of Merit of the Federal Republic of Germany (15 November 1976), for reports from the Lebanese civil war
 1983: Eduard Rhein Prize, award for "outstanding achievements in research and/or development in the areas of radio, television and information technology", Culture Prize for the report Blutiger Sommer – Wiedersehen mit Beirut
 1995: BAMBI, German media prize, together with Hauser
 2004:  ("journalist prize of the German "), for critical journalism on bargain hunters

Publications 
Kienzle's publications are held by the German National Library, including:
 . Droemer Knaur, München 1985, . ("South Africa. Whites in the wagon fort").
 . Hofmann & Campe, Hamburg 1995,  (together with Bodo H. Hauser). ("Any more questions, Kienzle? Yes, Hauser! The official German opinion guide").
 . Hoffmann & Campe, Hamburg 1997,  (together with Bodo H. Hauser). ("Black-Red-Gold. The official German guidebook on the market")
 . Heyne, München 1999,  (together with Bodo H. Hauser). ("Totally head-on. Quotations and controversies from seven years on TV").
 . Heyne, München 2000,  (together with Bodo H. Hauser). ("Please be quite hostile! Better living and debating in the new millennium").
 . Heyne, München 2001,  (together with Bodo H. Hauser). ("Kitchen Cabinet. Eating and drinking with rightists and leftists.")
 . Edition Sagas, Stuttgart 2008,  (mit Audio-CD). (an essay on the cultural history of the Swabian people).
 . Edition Sagas, Stuttgart 2011, . ("A farewell to A Thousand and One Nights. My attempt to understand the Arabs").

References

External links 

 
 

1936 births
2020 deaths
People from Ludwigsburg (district)
People from the Free People's State of Württemberg
Writers from Baden-Württemberg
German television journalists
German male journalists
20th-century German journalists
21st-century German journalists
German male writers
ZDF people
ARD (broadcaster) people
Radio Bremen people
University of Tübingen alumni
Recipients of the Cross of the Order of Merit of the Federal Republic of Germany